Habenaria fuscina, commonly known as the green rein orchid, is a species of orchid that is endemic to Cape York Peninsula. It has two or three leaves at its base and up to fifteen small green and white flowers with a labellum shaped like a trident.

Description
Flowering occurs from February to April.

Taxonomy and naming
Habenaria fuscina was first formally described in 2002 by David Jones and the description was published in The Orchadian. The specific epithet (fuscina) is Latin word meaning "a three-pronged fork" or "trident".

Distribution and habitat
The green rein grows with sedges and rushes in low-lying areas on the northern parts of the Cape York Peninsula.

References

Orchids of Queensland
Endemic orchids of Australia
Plants described in 2002
fuscina